Koiak 25 - Coptic Calendar - Koiak 27

The twenty-sixth day of the Coptic month of Koiak, the fourth month of the Coptic year. On a common year, this day corresponds to December 22, of the Julian Calendar, and January 4, of the Gregorian Calendar. This day falls in the Coptic season of Peret, the season of emergence. This day falls in the Nativity Fast.

Commemorations

Saints 

 The martyrdom of Saint Anastasia 
 The martyrdom of Saint Juliana

Other commemorations 

 The consecration of the Church of the two Martyrs Abba Bishay and Abba Peter

References 

Days of the Coptic calendar